Rootsman Blues is a reggae album by Lincoln Thompson in London, England and released in September 1983.

Track listing
Unite the world
Hail Shanti
Whopping good vibration
Rootsman Blues
Revolutionary man
You make me feel alright
Love the way it should be
Whopping good dub

1983 albums
Lincoln Thompson albums